The Hill Stakes is an Australian Turf Club Group 2 Thoroughbred horse race run at Weight for Age over a distance of 2000 metres at Randwick Racecourse, Sydney, Australia in September. Total prize money for the race is A$1,000,000.

History

1921 racebook

Venue

 1921–1990 - Rosehill Gardens Racecourse
 1991 - Canterbury Park Racecourse
 1991–2011 - Rosehill Gardens Racecourse
 2012 onwards - Randwick Racecourse

Grade
 1921–1978 - Principal Race
 1979 onwards - Group 2

Distance

 1921–1940 - 1 mile (~1600 metres)
 1941–1971 - 8 furlongs (~1700 metres)
 1972–1990 – 1750 metres
 1991–2000 – 1900 metres
 2001 – 1750 metres
 2002–2010 – 1900 metres
 2011–2016 – 2000 metres
 2017 – 1800 metres
 2018 onwards - 2000 metres

Gallery of noted winners

Winners
 
 2022 - Cascadian
 2021 - Think It Over
 2020 - Kolding
 2019 - Verry Elleegant
 2018 - Ace High
 2017 - Classic Uniform
 2016 - Hartnell
 2015 - Preferment
2014 - Junoob
2013 - Moriarty
2012 - Lamasery
2011 - Trusting
2010 - Descarado
2009 - Miss Marielle
2008 - Fiumicino
2007 - †race not held
2006 - Desert War
2005 - Desert War
2004 - Natural Blitz
2003 - Excellerator
2002 - Dress Circle
2001 - Mulan Princess
2000 - Pasta Express
1999 - Tie The Knot
1998 - Arena
1997 - Ebony Grosve
1996 - Saintly
1995 - Stony Bay
1994 - Slight Chance
1993 - Silk Ali
1992 - Muirfield Village
1991 - Super Impose
1990 - Eastern Classic
1989 - Riverina Charm
1988 - Natural Habit
1987 - Beau Zam
1986 - Colour Page
1985 - Greatness
1984 - Trissaro
1983 - Emancipation
1982 - Cossack Prince
1981 - Canarthus
1980 - Silver Wraith
1979 - Imposing
1978 - Marceau
1977 - Carlaw
1976 - Ngawyni
1975 - Skyjack
1974 - Leica Lover
1973 - Grand Cidium
1972 - Gunsynd
1971 - Baguette
1970 - Flagrante
1969 - Black Onyx
1968 - Eternal Youth
1967 - Winfreux
1966 - Prince Grant
1965 - Eskimo Prince
1964 - Toi Port
1963 - Toi Port
1962 - Sky High
1961 - Lord Fury
1960 - Waipari
1959 - Noholme
1958 - Skyline
1957 - Redcraze
1956 - Redcraze
1955 - Somerset Fair
1954 - Prince Cortauld
1953 - Hydrogen
1952 - Hydrogen
1951 - San Domenico
1950 - Playboy
1949 - Vagabond
1948 - Dark Marne
1947 - Columnist
1946 - Bernborough
1945 - Shannon
1944 - Mayfowl
1943 - Yaralla
1942 - Yaralla 
1941 - High Caste
1940 - Beau Vite
1939 - Gold Rod
1938 - Gold Rod
1937 - Talking
1936 - Silver Ring
1935 - Peter Pan
1934 - Chatham
1933 - Chatham
1932 - Peter Pan
1931 - Phar Lap
1930 - Phar Lap
1929 - Winalot
1928 - Limerick
1927 - Limerick
1926 - Valicare
1925 - The Hawk
1924 - Ballymena
1923 - The Hawk
1922 - Gloaming
1921 - Beauford

† Not held because of outbreak of equine influenza

See also
 List of Australian Group races
 Group races

References

Horse races in Australia
Open middle distance horse races